Chraponianka is a small river of Poland, a tributary of the Skrwa Prawa near Pianki.

Rivers of Poland
Rivers of Masovian Voivodeship